The Transilvania International Film Festival (TIFF) is the first international feature film festival in Romania, which is held annually in the historic capital of Transylvania, Cluj-Napoca. Founded in 2002 by the Romanian Film Promotion, TIFF has grown rapidly to become the most important film-related event in Romania. It is a member of the Alliance of Central and Eastern European Film Festivals (CentEast) and it is supported by the Creative Europe – MEDIA Programme. In February 2011, TIFF has been accredited by the FIAPF as a "competitive festival specialised on first and second feature films". Indiewire listed it as one of the world's top 50 leading film festivals.

The festival takes place in 20 locations around the city, including outdoor and unconventional places. Since 2007 the festival is also held in Sibiu. It is the year when Sibiu was declared European Capital of Culture. Transilvania IFF's main goal is the promotion of cinematic art by presenting some of the most innovative and spectacular films of the moment that feature both originality and independence of expression, that reflect unusual cinematic language forms or focus on current trends in youth culture. The competition is dedicated to first and second feature films.

Since 2018 the festival is also held in Oradea.

The festival also developed a strong educational platform for children, through EducaTIFF (awarded Best Educational Project in Romania, at Education Awards Gala, 2011 edition), and teenagers, through Let's Go Digital! The intensive workshop gives teenagers the opportunity to cover all the steps of filmmaking under the supervision of film professionals and using modern equipment.

After years of continuous work in promoting Romanian cinema and welcoming international guests to meet national productions and their filmmakers, in 2015, the festival rounded up its industry activities under one umbrella. TIFF – Industry is open for talents from Romania and Moldova and is gathering Transilvania Talent Lab (TTL) – the hands-on programme dedicated to emerging talents, and Transilvania Pitch Stop (TPS) – a tailor-made workshop for feature fiction films wrapping up with a public presentation and one-to-one meetings. TIFF – Industry hosts a series of masterclasses, lining-up experts in audience development, and script writing, film directors, documentarist and personalities. TIFF Industry also means closed screenings for industry members and special screenings of the newest Romanian films, in the presence of their filmmakers.

History 

TIFF is the first film festival in Romania with an international feature film competition. The 2007 festival made use of the character Count Dracula for promotional materials, along with a mascot resembling Count Orlok from the Dracula-inspired 1922 film Nosferatu, followed by a screening of the classic film.

In 2016, TIFF attracted more than 120,000 attendees.

Awards 

 Transilvania Trophy;
 Best Directing Award;
 Special Jury Award;
 Best Performance Award;
 Special mention of the jury;
 FIPRESCI Award;
 Audience Award;
 Excellency Award;
 Lifetime Achievement Award;
 Romanian Days Award for Feature Film;
 Romanian Days Award for Short Film;
 Romanian Days Award for Best Debut;
 Award for the Best Film in the Shadows Shorts Competition;
 Special Mention of the Short Film Jury in the Romanian Days;
 Let's Go Digital! Award for the Best Film Produced in the LGD! Workshop;
 Transilvania Pitch Stop Development Award;
 Transilvania Pitch Stop Post Production Award;
 Local Competition Award;
 Special Mention at the Local Competition;
 Young Francophone Jury Prize.

Over the years, Transilvania IFF's Lifetime Achievement Award has been presented to important figures of European and worldwide cinema, including Sophia Loren Nastassja Kinski, Jiří Menzel, Debra Winger, Claude Lelouch, Geraldine Chaplin, Wim Wenders, Marin Karmitz, Jacqueline Bisset, Michael York, Catherine Deneuve, Claudia Cardinale, Annie Girardot, Udo Kier, Vanessa Redgrave, Nicolas Roeg and Franco Nero.

Transilvania Trophy recipients

See also 
 Comedy Cluj
 Gay Film Nights

References

External links 
  

Culture in Cluj-Napoca
Film festivals in Romania
Spring (season) events in Romania